Korani District is a district (bakhsh) in Bijar County, Kurdistan Province, Iran. At the 2006 census, its population was 14,271, in 3,409 families.  The District has one city: Yasukand. The District has three rural districts (dehestan): Gorgin Rural District, Korani Rural District, and Taghamin Rural District.

References 

Bijar County
Districts of Kurdistan Province